Klang is a commune in the Moselle department in Grand Est in north-eastern France.

History
The commune was constructed on the ruins of an important village of Gallo-Roman origin. As of 1661, Klang was under the control of France.

Administration

Population

See also
 Communes of the Moselle department

References

External links
 

Communes of Moselle (department)